Sandro Lombardi (born 12 July 1986) is a retired Swiss footballer.

Biography
Lombardi started his career at Grasshopper Club Zürich, and played for its reserve team at regional league. In 2009, he joined Italian Lega Pro Seconda Divisione and a year later signed a reported 3-year contract. However he only played twice in 2010–11 Lega Pro Seconda Divisione.

In July 2011 he returned to Switzerland for Wil in 1-year contract.

Lombardi decided to retire at the end of the 2018-19 season.

References

External links

1986 births
Living people
Swiss men's footballers
Swiss Challenge League players
Grasshopper Club Zürich players
FC Winterthur players
Aurora Pro Patria 1919 players
FC Wil players
FC Lugano players
Association football midfielders
Swiss expatriate footballers
Expatriate footballers in Italy
Swiss expatriate sportspeople in Italy